Stephen Michael James Ovett,  (born 9 October 1955) is a retired British track athlete. A middle-distance runner, he was the gold medalist in the 800 metres at the 1980 Olympic Games in Moscow, and set 5 world records for 1500 metres and the mile run and a world record at two miles. He won 45 consecutive 1500 and mile races from 1977 to 1980.

Early life
Born in Brighton, Sussex, and educated at Varndean Grammar School, Ovett was a talented teenage athlete. As a youngster, he showed great promise as a footballer, but gave it up for athletics, because he did not want to play a sport where he would have to rely on teammates. As a youngster he won the under-15 (Junior boys) English Schools' Athletics Championships title at 400 metres in 1970 and the under-17 (Intermediate boys) 800 metres title in 1972.

Athletics career

Early promise
Ovett's first major athletics title came in 1973, when he won the 800 metres at the 1973 European Athletics Junior Championships. The following year, still only aged 18, he won the silver medal at 800 metres in the 1974 European Athletics Championships, setting a new European Junior 800m record of 1:45.77 in the process. Ovett won AAA titles in the 800m from 1974 to 1976; he would later add to these AAA titles by winning the 1500m in 1979 and the mile in 1980.

Ovett gained some Olympic experience in 1976 Summer Olympics in Montreal, Quebec, Canada, when he ran in the final of the 800m and was placed fifth, behind winner Alberto Juantorena of Cuba. Ovett finished fifth because he ran the first lap too inconsistently. He failed to reach the 1500 m final, having been obstructed in the semi-final when Canadian athlete Dave Hill fell and Ovett had to hurdle over him. As this happened 170m from the finish, Ovett had little time to recover, and was out-sprinted to the line by fellow countryman, Dave Moorcroft, with Ovett finishing only sixth.

Break-through to world prominence
Ovett gained prominence in 1977 when he began to regularly defeat the 1500 metres Olympic champion John Walker. In the early season Debenhams Mile, Ovett defeated Walker and set a British record of 3:54.7. Then in the European Cup 1500m, Ovett produced an outstanding last lap of 52.4 seconds to win a fiercely competitive race just ahead of his friend and rival Thomas Wessinghage. At the inaugural IAAF World Cup in Athletics, he commenced a "kick" with 200m to go, running the final turn in 11.8 s and the last 200m in 25.1 s. He left John Walker and the rest of the field far behind. Walker was so astonished by Ovett's kick, that he dropped out of the race with 120 metres to go. He won gold ahead of his good friend, West German Thomas Wessinghage. As Ovett raced away from the field, Ron Pickering, commenting for the race on BBC Television, said "and there's one man's blazing speed that has torn this field asunder". Ovett's time of 3:34.45 was a British Record.

The British public by now showed a keen interest in Ovett, and it was at the European Championships in 1978, that he raced against Sebastian Coe for the first time in their senior careers, beginning a keen rivalry that would become newsworthy. He led Coe in the 800m and appeared to be on his way to gold, before being surprisingly caught by the East German Olaf Beyer. After the fall of the GDR, Beyer's name would be found in the Stasi files of athletes alleged to have doped. His time of 1:44:09 turned out to be his fastest ever 800m run. Coe finished 3rd. At the time the British press reported that Coe and Ovett had clashed after the race but Coe later revealed: "When Steve came over, he put his hand on my shoulder and said something. The media thought we were having a row, but what Steve actually said was, 'Who the **** was that'?" Ovett recovered to win the gold medal in the 1500m, in which Coe did not participate. In that race, Ovett waved to the crowd on the home straight and clearly slowed down in the last metres yet still won by over a second from Ireland's Eamonn Coghlan.

The 1978 season for Ovett was notable for the superb times recorded at disparate distances. He ran an 800m in 1:44.09 (world record at the time was Alberto Juantorena's 1:43.44) and set a 2-mile world's best with an 8:13.51 clocking, (an event the IAAF does not recognise for record purposes), handing Track & Field News Athlete of the Year Henry Rono one of his few losses in his remarkable record-breaking season.

During his career, Ovett was noted for the unusual range and timing of his races; shortly before the 1980 Olympics in 10 days he ran four events of four different lengths: a mile in Oslo, 800 metres in Gothenburg, 600m at Crystal Palace and 3,000m in Welwyn Garden City. In 1977, when an airline strike forced him to miss a scheduled event, he signed up at the last minute for the Dartford half-marathon and won it with ease, running a course more than twice as long as anything he had attempted in public before, against the British marathon champion.

Ovett arrived at the 1980 Moscow Olympics as favourite to take the 1500 m title, being unbeaten over the 1500 m and the mile for three years. Earlier that month, he had established a new mile world record of 3:48.8 and two weeks later equalled Sebastian Coe's world record of 3:32.1 in the 1500 m. The Moscow Olympics marked only the second time that Ovett and Coe had met each other in international competition (the first being the 800 m in the 1978 European Championships), and there was huge media speculation over which would emerge as the greater.

Ovett's participation in the 800 m would serve as a test for the 1500 m. In the 800 m final, Ovett was only in sixth place at the halfway mark, but pushed his way through the crowd to second place. Seventy metres from the line, Ovett took the lead and held off a challenge from Coe to win by three metres. In the 1500 m, contested six days later, Ovett ran close behind Coe's shoulder for most of the race, but on the final bend Coe made a strong 'kick' and Ovett dropped two metres behind, unable to close the gap in the home straight. Coe won gold, East Germany's Jürgen Straub, who had accelerated after 800 metres, held off Ovett for the silver medal, and Ovett had to settle for bronze.

Though in 1980 Ovett had tied Coe's 1500 m world record of 3:32.1, new timing rules would come into effect in 1981, which would recognise records over 400 m to the hundredth of a second. This would have the effect of giving Coe sole possession of the record, as Coe ran 3:32.03 to Ovett's 3:32.09. However, Ovett avoided this unusual removal of a record via rule change by setting a new record later in 1980 of 3:31.36.

During 1981, both Ovett and Coe were at their peak. They didn't meet in a race that year but exchanged world records in the mile three times during an astonishing 9-day period. Ovett suffered a famous upset in a 1500m race in Oslo that year. With Ovett and Coe so dominant and Coe not involved in the race, Ovett was hot favourite. During the race Tom Byers, who had been asked to act as a pacemaker set off quickly and the pack, being given the split times for the leader and believing that they were going faster than they actually were, declined to follow his pace. As a result, by the start of the last lap Byers had a lead of almost ten seconds and so decided to finish the race. Ovett ran the last lap almost nine seconds quicker than Byers but finished second by 0.53s, later commenting "We all ran like a load of beginners."

Ovett's 1982 season was wrecked by injury. When out training on the streets of Brighton in late 1981, he tripped and impaled his thigh on some low railings at St John the Baptist Church on Church Road. He had recovered by the spring of 1982, but further injuries hampered his progress.

Later career
He returned to action in 1983, although once again his season had been hampered by injuries, which resulted in his not being selected for the 800 m at the World Championships in Helsinki. He was selected for the 1500 m, but ran a poor tactical race in the final and finished 4th, behind winner Steve Cram. He was yet to reach his peak for 1983, which followed with a 1500 m world record of 3:30.77 in Rieti. A few days later, he finished a close 2nd to Steve Cram in an epic mile race in Crystal Palace.

In 1984, after a successful season of winter training in Australia, Ovett's progress was slightly hampered by minor injuries and a bout of bronchitis. He attempted to defend his 800 m title in the 1984 Olympic Games, but after arriving in Los Angeles he began to suffer from respiratory problems. He was unlucky to be drawn against eventual winner Joaquim Cruz in each of his two heats and also the semi-final, in which he only narrowly qualified for the final, lunging for the finish in 4th place and appearing to collapse over the line. He had run 1:44:81, his second fastest time ever at the distance. He recovered in time to make the final, but was clearly below his best and finished eighth, after which he collapsed and spent two nights in hospital. Against the advice of his friends and doctors, he returned a few days later to compete in the 1500 m. Running in fourth place at the beginning of the last lap of the final, Ovett dropped out. He later collapsed with chest pains and was taken away on a stretcher.

His career then wound down, although in August 1986 he won the 5000 m at the Commonwealth Games in Edinburgh. However, the following month, in the European Championships, he failed to finish in hot conditions, allowing Jack Buckner (GB) - whom Ovett had beaten with consummate ease in Edinburgh - to win the gold. In the 1987 World Athletics Championships, he finished a lacklustre tenth in the 5000-metres final. He then failed to make the 1988 Olympic team and finally announced his retirement in 1991, a year after Sebastian Coe.

Post-retirement
He has been a track and field television commentator for the Canadian Broadcasting Corporation since 1992. He now lives in Australia and was a part of the BBC's on-location commentary team for the 2006 Commonwealth Games in Melbourne.

In 1987 a bronze statue of Steve Ovett was erected in Preston Park, Brighton. However, it was stolen in 2007, and later replaced in 2012 with a copy of the original. (The replacement is in Madeira Drive.)

Personal life
During the Moscow Games, the British press homed in on a signal Ovett had made to a television camera in Moscow, after his 800m win. It later transpired that the signal represented the letters ILY (I love you) and were intended for his girlfriend, Rachel Waller (whom he later married, but from whom he is now divorced).

His brother, Nick Ovett, represented Great Britain at luge in the Winter Olympics of 1988 and 1992.

Ovett's son Freddy also showed promise as a middle distance runner, winning the U-13 Pan-Pacific 800m title, before switching to road cycling after sustaining a knee injury whilst at the University of Oregon. He joined the development squad of the French  team in 2015.

Personal bests

From UK Athletics

References

1955 births
Living people
Sportspeople from Brighton
English male middle-distance runners
Olympic athletes of Great Britain
Olympic gold medallists for Great Britain
Olympic bronze medallists for Great Britain
Athletes (track and field) at the 1976 Summer Olympics
Athletes (track and field) at the 1980 Summer Olympics
Athletes (track and field) at the 1984 Summer Olympics
English Olympic medallists
Commonwealth Games medallists in athletics
Commonwealth Games gold medallists for England
Athletes (track and field) at the 1986 Commonwealth Games
European Athletics Championships medalists
World Athletics Championships athletes for Great Britain
World record setters in athletics (track and field)
BBC Sports Personality of the Year winners
Medalists at the 1980 Summer Olympics
Officers of the Order of the British Empire
Olympic gold medalists in athletics (track and field)
Medallists at the 1986 Commonwealth Games